In a natural circulation boiler the circulation is achieved by the difference in density when the water in the boiler is heated. In natural circulation steam boilers the circulation of water is by convection currents, which are set up during the heating of water. In most of the boilers there is a natural circulation of water the fundamental principle of which is based on the principle of Thermosiphon.

See also
Controlled circulation
Forced circulation boiler 
Once through steam generator 

Boilers